The Nuffield Guppy was a small military vehicle designed by Sir Alec Issigonis while he worked for the Nuffield Organization in the early 1940s. It had large balloon tyres and an outboard motor at the rear. It was capable of carrying one person with equipment, or being used as a motorised wheelbarrow by someone walking alongside the vehicle.

The war in Europe ended before the Guppy saw service.

The similar name "Nuffield Gutty" was subsequently used for several unrelated prototype vehicles.

See also 
 Mini Moke
 Austin Ant
 Austin Champ

References 

Military vehicles introduced from 1945 to 1949
Issigonis vehicles